Anolis oligaspis, the Bahama anole, is a species of lizard in the family Dactyloidae. The species is found in the Bahamas.

References

Anoles
Reptiles described in 1894
Endemic fauna of the Bahamas
Reptiles of the Bahamas
Taxa named by Edward Drinker Cope